Elections to the French National Assembly were held in French Dahomey and French Togoland on 2 June 1946. The territory elected two seats to the Assembly via two electoral colleges. Pierre Bertho of the Popular Republican Movement was elected from the first college and Sourou-Migan Apithy in the second.

Results

First College

Second College

References

Dahomey
Elections in Benin
1946 in French Dahomey
1946 1
1946 in French Togoland
1946-06
June 1946 events in Africa